MassTransit Enterprise, a managed file transfer server from GroupLogic, Inc, (Arlington, Virginia, USA), runs on Windows and Macintosh operating systems and provides a range of managed file transfer functions.

MassTransit was originally released as Adobe Virtual Network in 1995.

MassTransit capabilities
MassTransit supports a number of TCP/IP based file transfer protocols including HTTP, HTTPS, FTP, SFTP, an optimized proprietary protocol MTAP, a secure version of MTAP as well as a UDP Data Transport version of MTAP based on User Datagram Protocol (UDP).

MassTransit server (masstransit.exe) requires Windows and supports Windows Server 2008 (R2, 32-bit & 64-bit) and Windows 2003 Server. Active Directory users and groups control access to the transfer and reporting capabilities.

MassTransit release history
 MassTransit 7.5 September 2014
 MassTransit 7.3 February 2014
 MassTransit 7.2.7 August 2012
 MassTransit 7.2.6 March 2012
 MassTransit 7.2.5 April 2012
 MassTransit 7.2.4 November 2011
 MassTransit 7.2.3 June 2011
 MassTransit 7.0.0 1 July 2010
 MassTransit 6.1.1 December 2009
 MassTransit 6.1 November 2009
 MassTransit 6.0.1x04 December 2008
 MassTransit 6.0 for Mac OS X and Windows in November 2008.
 MassTransit 5.1.2 as hot fixes for Mac OS X and Windows from March to July 2008.
 MassTransit 5.1.1 as hot fixes for Mac OS X and Windows in February 2008.
 MassTransit 5.1 9/10/2007 for Mac OS X and Windows.
 MassTransit 5.0.2 as hot fixes for Mac OS X and Windows from January to August 2007. 
 MassTransit 5.0.1 November 2006. 
 MassTransit 5.0
 MassTransit 4.5.1 as a series of hot fixes from April 2004 through March 2006.
 MassTransit 1.0 released as Adobe Virtual Network 1.0 April 1996

References

 Mac Observer Interviews Group Logic CEO
 BusinessWeek Private Company Information: Group Logic, Inc.
 Key Issues for Managed File Transfer, 2009 19 February 2009 | ID:G00165299
 Moving Beyond MFT to File Services 29 May 2009 | ID:G00168386
 Data Encryption Not Enough to Prevent FTP Credential Theft 6 July 2009 | ID:G00169584
 Hype Cycle for Data and Application Security, 2009 17 July 2009 | ID:G00168605

External links
 Company website
 Enterprise Desktop Alliance Website
 Apple solutions guide
 Microsoft solutions directory

Software companies based in Virginia
File Transfer Protocol
Data synchronization
Email attachment replacements
Computer files